The  was a Japanese noble family of imperial descent

Name 
The name of the clan is also read Arihara.

History 
The descendants of Narihira, a great waka poet, continued to flourish. The clan remained politically obscure, however, due to pressure from the powerful Fujiwara clan.

Family tree

References